The ARM Cortex-A8 is a 32-bit processor core licensed by ARM Holdings implementing the ARMv7-A architecture.

Compared to the ARM11, the Cortex-A8 is a dual-issue superscalar design, achieving roughly twice the instructions per cycle. The Cortex-A8 was the first Cortex design to be adopted on a large scale in consumer devices.

Features

Key features of the Cortex-A8 core are:
 Frequency from 600 MHz to 1 GHz and above
 Superscalar dual-issue microarchitecture
 NEON SIMD instruction set extension  
 13-stage integer pipeline and 10-stage NEON pipeline 
 VFPv3 Floating Point Unit
 Thumb-2 instruction set encoding
 Jazelle RCT (Also known as ThumbEE instruction set)
 Advanced branch prediction unit with >95% accuracy
 Integrated level 2 Cache (0–4 MiB)
 2.0 DMIPS/MHz

Chips
Several system-on-chips (SoC) have implemented the Cortex-A8 core, including:
 Allwinner A1X
 Apple A4
 Freescale Semiconductor  i.MX51 
 Rockchip RK2918, RK2906 
 Samsung Exynos 3110
 TI OMAP3
 TI Sitara ARM Processors
 Conexant CX92755

See also

 ARM architecture
 Comparison of ARMv7-A cores
 JTAG
 List of applications of ARM cores
 List of ARM cores

References
"ARM Cortex: The force that drives mobile devices"

External links
ARM Holdings
 
 ARM Cortex-A8 Technical Reference Manuals

ARM processors
ARM Holdings IP cores